Église Sainte-Jeanne-de-Chantal may refer to:
 Sainte-Jeanne-de-Chantal (Paris), a church in Paris
 Sainte-Jeanne-de-Chantal (Île Perrot), a church in Quebec